Silke Meier (born 13 July 1968) is a former professional tennis player from Germany who played on the WTA tour from 1985 to 1999. She reached the third round of the US Open in 1990 and, over her career, recorded victories against Jana Novotná, Helena Suková and Manuela Maleeva.

WTA Tour finals

Singles 1

Doubles 4 (1–3)

ITF finals

Singles (3–0)

Doubles (4–7)

External links

 
 
 

German female tennis players
West German female tennis players
1968 births
Living people
Sportspeople from Wiesbaden
Tennis people from Hesse